Gary Chivers (born 15 May 1960) is an English former footballer who played as a defender in the Football League for Chelsea, Swansea City, Queens Park Rangers, Watford, Brighton & Hove Albion, AFC Bournemouth, and in the Norwegian Premier League for Lyn Oslo.

A central defender, Chivers began his career with Chelsea in 1979, and remained with the club until 1983, a poor period in the club's history. He then moved to Swansea City, followed by spells with Queens Park Rangers and Watford. He settled at Brighton & Hove Albion, enjoying a six-year stint with the club from 1987. He spent the summer of 1993 playing in Norway with Lyn Oslo before playing out his career at AFC Bournemouth, retiring from professional football in 1995. He played non-league football in Sussex, becoming a chauffeur (with his own stretch-limo) for a living in Surrey before going on to work in the football-related media and in private coaching.

References

1960 births
Living people
Footballers from Stockwell
English footballers
Association football defenders
Chelsea F.C. players
Swansea City A.F.C. players
Queens Park Rangers F.C. players
Watford F.C. players
Brighton & Hove Albion F.C. players
Lyn Fotball players
AFC Bournemouth players
Worthing F.C. players
St. Leonards F.C. players
English Football League players
Eliteserien players
Expatriate footballers in Norway
English expatriate footballers